Ortwin Hess (born 1966) is a German-born theoretical physicist at Trinity College Dublin (Ireland) and Imperial College London (UK), working in condensed matter optics. Bridging condensed matter theory and quantum optics he specialises in quantum nanophotonics, plasmonics, metamaterials and semiconductor laser dynamics. Since the late 1980s he has been an author and coauthor of over 300 peer-reviewed articles, the most popular of which, called Trapped rainbow' storage of light in metamaterials", was cited more than 400 times. He pioneered active (gain enhanced) nanoplasmonics and metamaterials with quantum gain and in 2014 he introduced the "stopped-light lasing" principle as a novel route to cavity-free (nano-) lasing and localisation of amplified surface plasmon polaritons,  giving him an h-index of 33.

Early life
Hess is a graduate of the University of Erlangen and Technical University of Berlin. From 1995 to 2003 he was post-doc at both Edinburgh and Marburg Universities following by becoming faculty staff at the Institute of Technical Physics in Stuttgart, Germany in 1997. In 1998 he became adjunct professor at the Department of Physics of the University of Stuttgart and subsequently also became Docent of Photonics at the Finnish Tampere University of Technology. From 1997 to 1998 he was visiting professor at Stanford University and in 1999/2000 visiting professor at the University of Munich. In July 2012 he was a visiting professor from Abbe School of Photonics. Hess currently holds the Leverhulme Chair in Metamaterials at London's Imperial College and is co-director of the Centre for Plasmonics and Metamaterials.

Research
Investigating slow light in metamaterials Hess has discovered and explained the ‘trapped-rainbow’ principle by which the constituent colours of a light pulse are brought to a complete stand-still at different points inside a metamaterial (or plasmonic) heterostructre. He pioneered active metamaterials with quantum gain, developed the theory for optical chirality in self-organised nanoplasmonic metamaterials and recently introduced ‘stopped-light lasing’ as a novel route to cavity-free nanolasing and localisation of amplified surface plasmon polaritons (SPP) that is reminiscent of SPP-condensation.

Interest in the field of ‘slow’ and ‘stopped’ light arises from the prospect of obtaining much better control over light signals, with extremely nonlinear effects in interactions between light and matter, and optical quantum memories facilitating new architectures to process quantum information. With conventional dielectric materials, having a positive refractive index, it is impossible to ‘stop’ travelling light signals completely, not least because of the presence of structural disorder. This was an important observation, which Hess made from his extensive studies of slow light in semiconductor quantum dots and the dynamics of their spontaneous emission close to the stopped-light point in photonic crystals. Hess showed theoretically that a way to overcome this fundamental limitation of conventional media was to use nanoplasmonic waveguide structures.

Hess has also made contributions to spatiotemporal and nonlinear dynamics in semiconductor lasers and research in computational photonics. Algorithms and codes developed in his group run on high-performance parallel computers and have been used to elucidate a rich variety of aspects of modern nano-physics ranging from the definition of temperature in nanoscale systems, to optimisation of ultrashort pulses in experimentally realised quantum-dot semiconductor optical amplifiers. Since 2011, Hess developed the theory of optical activity in chiral nanoplasmonic metamaterials that provided explanation of experiments on tunability in self-organised gold metamaterials.

Recently Hess has started to develop "meta-lasers" and proposed "stopped-light nanolasing". This exploits and unites his competence in nanoplasmonic metamaterials, quantum photonics and semiconductor lasers. Initially the motivation for the work was to compensate dissipative losses in metamaterials by introducing gain. But now, one aims at realising a new class of ultrafast ‘stopped-light nanolasers’, with unprecedented design features such as being smaller than a fifth of the wavelength and ultrafast and providing a platform to integrate both light and amplified plasmons, to enable integration at the nanoscale with semiconductor chips for telecommunications.

References

 Hamm, J. M., & Hess, O. (2013). Two Two-Dimensional Materials are Better Than One, Science 340, 1298–1299.
 Pusch, A., Wuestner, S., Hamm, J. M., Tsakmakidis, K. L., & Hess, O. (2012). Coherent Amplification and Noise in Gain-Enhanced Nanoplasmonic Metamaterials: A Maxwell-Bloch Langevin Approach. ACS Nano, 6, 2420–2431.
 Hamm, J. M., Wuestner, S., Tsakmakidis, K. L., & Hess, O. (2011). Theory of light amplification in active fishnet metamaterials. Phys Rev Lett, 107, 167405.
 Wuestner, S., Pusch, A., Tsakmakidis, K. L., Hamm, J. M., & Hess, O. (2010). Overcoming losses with gain in a negative refractive index metamaterial. Phys Rev Lett, 105, 127401.
 Hess, O. (2008). Optics: Farewell to flatland. Nature, 455, 299–300.
 Bohringer, K., & Hess, O. (2008). A full-time-domain approach to spatio-temporal dynamics of semiconductor lasers. I. Theoretical formulation. Prog Quant Electron, 32, 159–246.
 Ruhl, T., Spahn, P., Hermann, C., Jamois, C., & Hess, O. (2006). Double-inverse-opal photonic crystals: The route to photonic bandgap switching. Adv Funct Materials, 16, 885.
 Gehrig, E., Hess, O., Ribbat, C., Sellin, R. L., & Bimberg, D. (2004). Dynamic filamentation and beam quality of quantum-dot lasers. Appl Phys Lett, 84, 1650.

External links

 Official Site

1966 births
Academics of Imperial College London
British physicists
Living people
Academic staff of the Ludwig Maximilian University of Munich
Optical physicists
People associated with the University of Edinburgh
University of Erlangen-Nuremberg alumni
Academic staff of the University of Marburg